Legacy Early College Field is a 4,000-seat stadium located on the campus of Legacy Early College, a college preparatory school, in Greenville, South Carolina. The stadium is best known for being the home field for Greenville Triumph SC, a professional soccer club that plays in USL League One, the third tier of soccer in the United States.

References 

Greenville Triumph SC
Soccer venues in South Carolina
Buildings and structures in Greenville County, South Carolina
Sports venues in Greenville, South Carolina
USL League One stadiums